The Shire of Narrogin is a local government area in the Wheatbelt region of Western Australia, about  south-east of the state capital, Perth. The seat of government is in the town of Narrogin. Until 2016, when the two entities merged, the Narrogin townsite was governed by a separate local government area, the Town of Narrogin.

History
On 19 May 1892, the Narrogin Road District came into being. On 1 July 1961, it became a Shire under the Local Government Act 1960. In 1999 and 2004, proposals to merge the Shire with the Town of Narrogin were defeated at referendum. In 2016, on July 1, the Shire of Narrogin amalgamated with the Town of Narrogin.  The new entity retained the designation of Shire.

Wards

Both the Shire and the Town of Narrogin had wards, but they have since been abolished. Nine elected members now sit at large.

Towns and localities
The towns and localities of the Shire of Narrogi with population and size figures based on the most recent Australian census:

Population

Heritage-listed places

As of 2023, 188 places are heritage-listed in the Shire of Narrogin, of which 23 are on the State Register of Heritage Places.

References

External links
 

 
Narrogin